Tahakro (also spelled Taakro) is a village in eastern Ivory Coast. It is in the sub-prefecture of Amélékia, Abengourou Department, Indénié-Djuablin Region, Comoé District. The village sits on the southeast bank of the Comoé River, which forms the border between Comoé and Lacs Districts.

Tahakro was a commune until March 2012, when it became one of 1126 communes nationwide that were abolished.

Notes

Former communes of Ivory Coast
Populated places in Comoé District
Populated places in Indénié-Djuablin